The Wisconsin Government Accountability Board (G.A.B.) was a regulatory agency for the State of Wisconsin which administered and enforced Wisconsin law pertaining to campaign finance, elections, ethics and lobbying. The agency was re-organized, over the opposition of many Democratic legislators, into two separate agencies (Ethics and Elections Commissions) following several controversies.

Composition
The Board consisted of six members, all former state judges, who serve staggered, six-year terms. Board members were appointed by the Governor, and served part-time, receiving per diems for each meeting they attended. The Governor of Wisconsin nominated a judge to fill a vacancy from a roster of potential Board members previously selected by a panel of Wisconsin Court of Appeals judges; and nominees were confirmed by the Wisconsin State Senate.

History and controversies
The G.A.B. was created as a reform measure after the Wisconsin "legislative caucus scandal" in 2001  which led to criminal convictions of the state Assembly's highest-ranking Republican (Speaker Scott Jensen), the state Senate's highest-ranking Democrat (Majority Leader Chuck Chvala), and other officials. The G.A.B. was tasked with overseeing elections, ethics and lobbying in the state. The 2007 Wisconsin Act 1, which passed the Wisconsin Legislature on a bipartisan vote in January 2007, merged the State Elections Board and State Ethics Board into the new G.A.B.

The G.A.B. had a nonpartisan structure unique among election boards in the United States, with G.A.B. led by six former judges appointed by the governor and confirmed by the state Senate. In contrast to the G.A.B.'s nonpartisan model, state election boards in other U.S. states were either partisan (ie., run by elected or appointed partisan officials) or bipartisan. G.A.B. members could not "hold another state or local public office (except as reserve judge), engage in partisan political activities, become a candidate for state or local elected office, make political contributions, or be a lobbyist or employed by a person who employs a lobbyist. They also have limitations on political activities and certain types of contributions both during and 12 months prior to a member's term." The G.A.B.'s structure was praised by some experts. 

Law professor Daniel P. Tokaji, who studied the G.A.B., praised the agency's model, concluding in 2013 that "GAB has been successful in administering elections evenhandledly and... serves as a worthy model for other states considering alternatives to partisan election administration at the state level." The Board has the power to investigate independently, without the approval of the legislature. The G.A.B. oversaw a series of recall elections for the state senate in 2011 and for state senate and governor in 2012. 

The G.A.B. was consistently criticized by Wisconsin Republicans, such as Assembly Speaker Robin Vos and Senate Majority Leader Scott L. Fitzgerald, and the conservative advocacy group Americans for Prosperity; these critics accused the G.A.B. of unfairly targeting Republicans. Republicans were particularly angry over a G.A.B. investigation into whether Republican Governor Scott Walker's campaign had unlawfully coordinated with the Club for Growth and other "outside" groups during the 2012 recall election. 

By contrast, Democrats and good-government groups such as the Wisconsin Democracy Campaign and Common Cause defended the G.A.B. In December 2015, Walker signed a bill that dissolved the G.A.B., effective on June 30, 2016, and replaced it with a separate Wisconsin Elections Board and Wisconsin Ethics Commission. 

The legislation dismantling the G.A.B. passed along party lines, with Republicans voting yes and Democrats voting no. Wisconsin's revision to a "bipartisan" rather than "nonpartisan" model increased the power of the Republican-controlled legislature, and also increased deadlocks; while the G.A.B. rarely deadlocked, the Elections Board frequently deadlocked among party lines. The 2015 legislation also restored the practice of allowing state legislators to control funding for investigations into possible misconduct by state officials.

References 

Government of Wisconsin
Politics of Wisconsin